Jason Nicholas Miller (born December 24, 1980) best known as Mayhem Miller is an American mixed martial arts fighter and TV host. Miller coaches fighters in Irvine, California at Mayhem Martial Arts and has trained extensively with Kings MMA in Huntington Beach, California. He has fought in the UFC, Strikeforce, WFA, WEC and DREAM.  Miller was the host of MTV's reality series Bully Beatdown.

Early life
Miller was born in Fayetteville, North Carolina, and he grew up in Fort Bragg, North Carolina. Miller's father was a paratrooper in the United States Army's 82nd Airborne Division. After Miller was expelled from high school for fighting, he and his family had to move 40 miles so that he could go to school in a new district. Miller knew he wanted to compete professionally. He earned his yellow belt in Taekwondo at age 11 and joined his high school's wrestling team and would challenge the instructors of karate schools to spar. He was guided by a judo instructor to attend one of the first mixed martial arts schools. Miller had his first fight in Virginia Beach when he was 17 years old, against 27-year-old Al "Superman" Dill. Miller won the fight and officially began his MMA career.

Mixed martial arts career
After his submission win over Ronald Jhun, earning Miller his first Superbrawl Championship, a riot broke out and Miller was punched in the back of the head by a fellow fighter, Mark Moreno. This set the stage for a grudge match, and Miller dominated Moreno, finishing him with an armbar at the end of round one making the shaka sign before finishing him.

On September 2, 2006, Mayhem won the Icon Sport Middleweight title from Robbie Lawler in a back and forth battle. After being staggered and nearly finished by Lawler, Mayhem secured an arm triangle choke and won in the third round. In December of the same year, Mayhem lost his first title defense to Frank Trigg via TKO in the second round, a fight many thought he was the favorite to win.

Mayhem stepped into the Dream 4 tournament on short notice and scored an impressive win in the semifinals, he was eliminated by Ronaldo Souza in the quarterfinals. Miller lost a unanimous decision to "Jacare" in a fast-paced grappling style bout that saw him escape submission after submission.

After back and forth battles of words on Japanese, Brazilian and American media, Miller and Souza fought again, but this time for the Dream Middleweight belt. (The title was vacant as Gegard Mousasi moved to the Light Heavyweight division.) The fight ended in a no-contest when Miller landed a soccer kick to Souza's forehead (formerly a legal strike, but had been outlawed), which opened a large gash and prompted a doctor stoppage. Both fighters agreed to face each other in an event in September 2009. The match was canceled after Souza signed with the Strikeforce promotion.

Miller fought Jake Shields on November 7, 2009, on CBS as a part of Strikeforce: Fedor vs Rogers. The fight was for the Strikeforce Middleweight Championship as Cung Le stepped down as champion. After a brief punching exchange that staggered Shields, the fight was mostly grappling, Miller lost via unanimous decision (48–47, 49–46, and 49–46). The closest the match came to ending was in the third round when Miller secured a rear naked choke on Shields, but time ended before Shields tapped out.

Mayhem fought Tim Stout at Strikeforce: Nashville on April 17, 2010, and won the fight by with a ground and pound TKO at 1:47 of the first round.

Miller was expected to face Robbie Lawler on June 16, 2010, at Strikeforce: Los Angeles, but was removed from the card after the Tennessee Athletic Commission suspended him for his part in the Nashville Brawl. After Shields' win over UFC veteran and former Pride FC Welterweight and Middlweight Champion Dan Henderson, Mayhem confronted Jake Shields for a title rematch. Although Jake was not surprised, Nick Diaz, Nate Diaz, and the rest of Team Gracie fought with Miller in the cage, prompting CBS announcer Gus Johnson to say "Gentlemen, we are on national television."

Although Mayhem aggressively called out Nick Diaz, the bout never materialized. Mayhem instead fought Kazushi Sakuraba on September 25, at Dream 16. In pre-fight interviews, Mayhem stated that he wished to be one of the only people to submit Sakuraba, "the Gracies couldn't do it, I want to". He would go on to do just that, and win the fight via arm triangle choke.

On April 22, 2011, Miller announced via Twitter that he had signed a multi-fight deal with the UFC due to his Strikeforce contract expiring.

Strikeforce: Nashville brawl
On April 17, 2010, following Jake Shields' victory over Dan Henderson, Miller entered the cage, without proper approval, during Shields' post-fight interview. During that interview, Mayhem interrupted Shields and asked "Where's my rematch, buddy?" Gilbert Melendez and Shields responded by pushing Miller away, and Nick Diaz then threw a punch at Miller which started a brawl. Members of the Cesar Gracie Jiu-Jitsu camp, including Melendez, Nick and Nate Diaz, attacked Miller while he was held down on the canvas by other members of the Gracie camp. The fight was eventually broken up by referees, members of Dan Henderson's corner and the promoter's security personnel.
Miller and five other participants in the brawl were each given three-month suspensions, and fines ranging between $5,000 and $7,500.

Following the events of the Nashville Brawl, Miller expressed an interest in fighting Nick Diaz. The 170-pound Diaz refused, stating he was the Strikeforce Welterweight Champion and needed to continue to fight at that weight. He requested Miller move down to 170 lb to fight him. Miller continued to attempt to set up a fight, offering 183 lb as a catchweight. Diaz counter-offered a catchweight of 181 lb. Scott Coker, CEO of Strikeforce was interested in setting up the fight, but failed to do so as Zuffa took over Strikeforce.

Return to the UFC
On April 22, 2011, Miller signed a multi-fight agreement with the UFC.

Miller was expected to face Aaron Simpson on July 2, 2011, at UFC 132. However, on May 27, 2011, it was revealed that Miller would be one of the coaches of The Ultimate Fighter Season 14, opposite to Michael Bisping. Miller was replaced by Brad Tavares on the UFC 132 card.

Miller was defeated by Bisping on December 3, 2011, at The Ultimate Fighter 14 Finale. Round 1 was controlled by Miller with grappling, but Miller tired after that round, and was defeated via TKO at 3:34 of the third round.

Miller was then defeated by C. B. Dollaway on May 26, 2012, at UFC 146. After dropping Dollaway with a right hand, Miller appeared to injure his left knee. He was taken down for the rest of the fight and lost via unanimous decision (29–28, 30–26, and 29–28). Miller had very publicly stated on his Twitter page that if he lost the fight, he would retire.

One day following the loss, Dana White ignored Miller's statement of retirement, instead opting to publicly fire Miller. White cited unspecified "backstage antics" on the part of Miller as a partial reason for the cut as well as Miller being a "clown" in his wardrobe choices before the fight. Miller later stated his side of the story, describing it as a brief confrontation with backstage official Burt Watson over Miller's attempt to wear a gasmask and colorful paper bag over his face for his walk-out.

MMA Hour incident
On October 8, 2012, Miller appeared on internet talk show, the MMA Hour. He was promoting an upcoming movie, Here Comes the Boom, and decided to give the interview "in character" as his character from the movie (Lucky Patrick). "Patrick" became upset when Ariel Helwani pressured him to give the interview as Jason Miller. The fictional Patrick stormed off of the set in a rage.

Return To MMA
On October 26, 2013, Miller announced on his official Twitter page that he would return to fighting. Venator FC announced on February 9, 2016, that Miller would face Luke Barnatt at Venator FC III for the promotion's Middleweight championship on May 21. After missing weight by 24 lb Miller was pulled from the fight and instead fought Mattia Schiavolin in a Light Heavyweight fight. Miller won the first round but gassed out in the second before being submitted by a rear naked choke.

Miller went on to say in an interview with Chael Sonnen that the loss to Schiavolin helped him to begin to turn his life around from the legal troubles and drug addiction that have plagued him since his retirement in 2012. He also went on to say that he felt a positive energy being back in the cage and would fight on, as a Light Heavyweight.

Legal issues
In August 2011, Miller was arrested in Chatham County, North Carolina and was charged with simple assault and false imprisonment after his sister accused Miller of assaulting her at a house party.

In August 2012, Miller was arrested in Mission Viejo, California and charged with trespassing and burglary after allegedly breaking into and destroying property in a church. According to a report, a pastor at the church called 911 after discovering items on the first floor had been destroyed. Miller was alleged to have broken several pictures and CDs, and to have torn up several of the churches books. Miller also allegedly discharged a fire extinguisher, leaving a residue trail up to the second floor where police say they found a naked Miller sleeping on a couch. He was taken into custody and later released on $20,000 bond. The charge was later dismissed when the pastor believed it would be best to give Miller spiritual guidance as opposed to jail time.

Miller was arrested on charges of domestic battery on August 11, 2013, and was released on bail the following day. On August 22, 2013, Miller was once again arrested for domestic battery. In court on August 26, the two charges were combined into one case with two felony counts of "corporal injury of a spouse." Miller pleaded not guilty and his bail was set at $100,000. On October 9, 2013, Miller was taken into custody for a misdemeanor contempt of court charge for violating a no-contact restraining order by sending a Snapchat message to the alleged victim. He was booked in the early hours of October 10.

Miller was arrested on a felony domestic violence warrant on October 9, 2014, after a five-hour-long standoff with a SWAT team outside his Orange County, California home. Over the course of the stand-off, Miller gave live updates through his Twitter account.

On March 7, 2015, Miller was arrested outside of a bar in Laguna Beach, California and charged with battery on a peace officer, unlawful fighting, and resisting arrest. Police were called after restaurant employees reported a disturbance, alleging that Miller was volatile and breaking glass inside the restaurant. Video footage from a bystander showed a handcuffed Miller outside the bar, shouting expletives and fighting with police officers.

On October 16, 2015, law enforcement responded to a domestic disturbance call at Miller's residence involving Miller and two women. After deputies arrived, Miller threw a ceramic tile at them and threatened them with a fire extinguisher and a metal pole. He was tased by police and arrested for assault.

On February 7, 2016, Miller was arrested in Irvine, California and charged with driving under the influence.

In March 2016, Miller was arrested in Mission Viejo, California after a warrant was served. He was charged with burglary and vandalism for breaking into and vandalizing a Lake Forest, California tattoo shop two months prior.

On July 11, 2016, Miller was arrested in Costa Mesa, California and charged with two counts of assault and battery after allegedly injuring a security guard and spitting on a police officer at the Saddle Ranch Chop House restaurant. The charges were later dismissed.

In November 2017, Miller was convicted of felony domestic battery after accepting a plea deal. He was sentenced to serve three years' probation with a suspended four-year prison sentence, with a probation violation punishable by up to four years in a California state prison.

On October 23, 2018, Miller was arrested on charges of felony vandalism in Orange County after destroying property at his girlfriend's La Habra, California home. Miller's girlfriend claimed that during an argument, Miller smashed a large marble table, punched holes in the walls, tore down doors, and derailed the home's garage door. He was arrested and held without bail in the Orange County detention center. The felony vandalism charge carried a maximum penalty of eight months in jail, but due to the nature of the incident, prior convictions, and a probation violation, Miller faced up to 23 years in a California state prison. While he initially pleaded not guilty, on July 19, 2019, it was reported that Miller had accepted a plea deal and was sentenced to one year in jail with time served being credited. He was released from jail in September 2019.

On August 21, 2020, Miller was arrested and charged with two felonies: first-degree burglary and grand theft auto. He was booked into the Orange County jail and held without bail. On May 11, 2021, Miller accepted a plea deal in which he pleaded guilty to the vandalism charge, while the grand theft auto charge was dismissed. Miller was sentenced to serve 364 days in jail and two years of probation upon release.

On September 10, 2021, Miller was arrested on felony domestic violence charges in Los Angeles, California. According to the arrest report, police were called to Miller's girlfriend's residence in Sherman Oaks in the early hours of September 10 after she claimed Miller physically assaulted her following a verbal argument. After law enforcement arrived on the scene, Miller locked himself in the bathroom. Officers noticed visible marks on the victim's face and neck consistent with an assault. Miller was eventually tased after resisting arrest and taken into custody. He was transported to the Los Angeles County Men's Jail where he was booked on charges of felony domestic battery and resisting arrest. Bail was initially set at $1.385 million, but was later reduced to $150,000.

In October 2021, Miller was formally charged with felony assault and battery for an incident that took place at a California bar prior to his September 2021 domestic battery arrest. Miller was involved in an altercation with a man at a bar; by the time police arrived, the situation had de-escalated, and the victim initially opted not to press charges. Following the incident, the man was hospitalized and discovered his ribs had been broken, after which he decided to press charges against Miller. Jason called in to Adam Hunter on YouTube on Jan 21st 2023 episode 766, and said that he may get out of prison in May "God willing."

Championships and accomplishments

Mixed Martial Arts
 Icon Sport
 Icon Sport Middleweight Championship (one time)
 Superbrawl
 Superbrawl Welterweight Championship (one time)
 North American Welterweight Championship (one time; first)
International Sport Combat Federation
ISCF East Coast Middleweight Championship (one time; first)
 One title defense 
 World MMA Awards
 Most Memorable Ring Entrance 2010 & 2009

Submission wrestling
 'Grapplers Quest Champion 2001, 2003, 2004
 Best in the West Champion 2003

Mixed martial arts record

|-
|Loss
| style="text-align:center;"| 23–10 (1)
| Mattia Schiavolin
| Submission (rear-naked choke)
| Venator FC 3
|  
| align=center| 2
| align=center| 3:10
| Milan, Italy
| 
|-
| Loss
| align=center| 23–9 (1)
| C.B. Dollaway
| Decision (unanimous)
| UFC 146
| 
| align=center| 3
| align=center| 5:00
| Las Vegas, Nevada, United States
| 
|-
| Loss
| align=center| 23–8 (1)
| Michael Bisping
| TKO (knees to the body and punches)
| The Ultimate Fighter 14 Finale
| 
| align=center| 3
| align=center| 3:34
| Las Vegas, Nevada, United States
| 
|-
| Win
| align=center| 23–7 (1)
| Kazushi Sakuraba
| Submission (arm-triangle choke)
| Dream 16
| 
| align=center| 1
| align=center| 2:09
| Nagoya, Japan
|
|-
| Win
| align=center| 22–7 (1)
| Tim Stout
| TKO (punches)
| Strikeforce: Nashville
| 
| align=center| 1
| align=center| 3:09
| Nashville, Tennessee, United States
|
|-
| Loss
| align=center| 21–7 (1)
| Jake Shields
| Decision (unanimous)
| Strikeforce: Fedor vs. Rogers
| 
| align=center| 5
| align=center| 5:00
| Hoffman Estates, Illinois, United States
| 
|-
| NC
| align=center| 21–6 (1)
| Ronaldo Souza
| NC (cut)
| Dream 9
| 
| align=center| 1
| align=center| 2:33
| Yokohama, Japan
| 
|-
| Win
| align=center| 21–6
| Kala Hose
| Submission (rear-naked choke)
| Kingdom MMA: Miller vs. Hose
| 
| align=center| 1
| align=center| 2:27
| Honolulu, Hawaii, United States
|
|-
| Loss
| align=center| 20–6
| Ronaldo Souza
| Decision (unanimous)
| Dream 4: Middleweight Grand Prix 2008 Second Round
| 
| align=center| 2
| align=center| 5:00
| Yokohama, Japan
| 
|-
| Win
| align=center| 20–5
| Katsuyori Shibata
| TKO (punches)
| Dream 3: Lightweight Grand Prix 2008 Second Round
| 
| align=center| 1
| align=center| 6:57
| Saitama, Japan
| 
|-
| Win
| align=center| 19–5
| Tim Kennedy
| Decision (unanimous)
| HDNet Fights – Reckless Abandon
| 
| align=center| 3
| align=center| 5:00
| Dallas, Texas, United States
|
|-
| Win
| align=center| 18–5
| Hiromitsu Miura
| Decision (unanimous)
| WEC 27
| 
| align=center| 3
| align=center| 5:00
| Las Vegas, Nevada, United States
|
|-
| Win
| align=center| 17–5
| Héctor Urbina
| TKO (punches)
| Icon Sport: Epic
| 
| align=center| 1
| align=center| 1:11
| Honolulu, Hawaii, United States
|
|-
| Loss
| align=center| 16–5
| Frank Trigg
| TKO (soccer kicks)
| Icon Sport – Mayhem vs Trigg
| 
| align=center| 2
| align=center| 2:53
| Honolulu, Hawaii, United States
| 
|-
| Win
| align=center| 16–4
| Robbie Lawler
| Submission (arm-triangle choke)
| Icon Sport – Mayhem vs Lawler
| 
| align=center| 3
| align=center| 2:50
| Honolulu, Hawaii, United States
| 
|-
| Win
| align=center| 15–4
| Lodune Sincaid
| Submission (rear-naked choke)
| WFA: King of the Streets
| 
| align=center| 1
| align=center| 4:29
| Los Angeles, California, United States
| 
|-
| Win
| align=center| 14–4
| Stefan Gamlin
| Submission (arm-triangle choke)
| Icon Sport – Mayhem vs Giant
| 
| align=center| 1
| align=center| 0:46
| Honolulu, Hawaii, United States
| 
|-
| Win
| align=center| 13–4
| Falaniko Vitale
| Submission (rear-naked choke)
| Icon Sport – Opposites Attract
| 
| align=center| 2
| align=center| 2:41
| Honolulu, Hawaii, United States
| 
|-
| Win
| align=center| 12–4
| Mark Moreno
| Submission (armbar)
| Superbrawl – Icon
| 
| align=center| 1
| align=center| 4:54
| Honolulu, Hawaii, United States
| 
|-
| Loss
| align=center| 11–4
| Georges St-Pierre
| Decision (unanimous)
| UFC 52
| 
| align=center| 3
| align=center| 5:00
| Las Vegas, Nevada, United States
| 
|
|-
| Win
| align=center| 11–3
| Ronald Jhun
| Technical Submission (arm-triangle choke)
| SB 37 – SuperBrawl 37
| 
| align=center| 2
| align=center| N/A
| Honolulu, Hawaii, United States
| 
|-
| Win
| align=center| 10–3
| Egan Inoue
| TKO (corner stoppage)
| SB 32 – SuperBrawl 32
| 
| align=center| 2
| align=center| 5:00
| Honolulu, Hawaii, United States
|
|-
| Win
| align=center| 9–3
| Sean Taylor
| Submission (triangle choke)
| SB 31 – SuperBrawl 31
| 
| align=center| 2
| align=center| 3:32
| Honolulu, Hawaii, United States
|
|-
| Win
| align=center| 8–3
| Mark Longworth
| Submission (rear-naked choke)
| PFC – Put Up or Shut Up
| 
| align=center| 2
| align=center| N/A
| Upland, California, United States
|
|-
| Win
| align=center| 7–3
| Jason Buck
| Decision (split)
| SB 30 – Collision Course
| 
| align=center| 3
| align=center| 3:00
| Honolulu, Hawaii, United States
| 
|-
| Loss
| align=center| 6–3
| Tim Kennedy
| Decision (unanimous)
| EC 50 – Extreme Challenge 50
| 
| align=center| 3
| align=center| 5:00
| Salt Lake City, Utah, United States
|
|-
| Win
| align=center| 6–2
| Denis Kang
| Submission (rear-naked choke)
| EC 50 – Extreme Challenge 50
| 
| align=center| 2
| align=center| 1:41
| Salt Lake City, Utah, United States
|
|-
| Win
| align=center| 5–2
| Todd Carney
| TKO (corner stoppage)
| FFP – February Fight Party
| 
| align=center| 1
| align=center| 2:31
| Atlanta, Georgia, United States
| 
|-
| Loss
| align=center| 4–2
| Todd Carney
| Submission (guillotine choke)
| ISCF – Atlanta
| 
| align=center| 1
| align=center| 1:32
| Atlanta, Georgia, United States
|
|-

|-
| Win
| align=center| 4–1
| Phil Ensminger
| Submission (triangle choke)
| RFC1 – The Beginning
| 
| align=center| 1
| align=center| 3:23
| Las Vegas, Nevada, United States
|
|-
| Win
| align=center| 3–1
| Toby Imada
| Decision (unanimous)
| XP 2 – Xtreme Pankration 2
| 
| align=center| 2
| align=center| 5:00
| Los Angeles, California, United States
|
|-
| Loss
| align=center| 2–1
| Chael Sonnen
| Decision (unanimous)
| HFP 1 – Rumble on the Reservation
| 
| align=center| 2
| align=center| 5:00
| Anza, California, United States
|
|-
| Win
| align=center| 2–0
| Todd Carney
| Submission (rear-naked choke)
| ISCF – Battle at the Brewery 2001
| 
| align=center| 2
| align=center| 2:53
| Atlanta, Georgia, United States
| 
|-
| Win
| align=center| 1–0
| Brian Warren
| Submission (rear-naked choke)
| UP 1 – Ultimate Pankration 1
| 
| align=center| 1
| align=center| 3:15
| Cabazon, California, United States
|
|-

Media
In the past, Miller appeared regularly on The Jason Ellis Show on Sirius XM Radio Faction (Sirius XM) XM 52 Sirius 41 on "Mayhem Mondays!!" as both a mixed martial arts expert and comedian, sharing amusing anecdotes and opinions. He returned to the Ellis Show for the first time since his incarceration on October 29, 2019.

Miller also appears briefly in several music videos of Jason Ellis's band TaintStick.

Miller also authors a monthly article for Fight! magazine with humorous articles on serious subjects.

He was the host of the MTV reality series Bully Beatdown in which he challenged bullies to a fight with other professional fighters, and if they accepted, they had the opportunity to win $10,000. If the bully lost, the person he picked on won the $10,000. In the first episode of the show's third season, Miller went on to take on the bully himself, making him lose all $10,000. Miller affectionately called his fans Mayhem Monkeys and himself the leader of the "monkey cult" and had a fan club of numbered monkeys.

Jason Miller appeared on G4's American Ninja Warrior, making it through the qualifying round with a time of 2:55.0. He was later eliminated in the second qualifying round.

He also appears in video games: Electronic Arts' EA Sports MMA and THQ's UFC Undisputed 3.

On July 20, 2010 (episode # 31), November 30, 2010 (episode #58), and September 28, 2011 (episode #143), Jason Miller appeared on the podcast "The Joe Rogan Experience".

Miller also appears in Here Comes the Boom'', in which he plays the role of "Lucky" Patrick Murray, an MMA fighter who goes in the ring against Kevin James's character, Scott Voss, in the film.

See also
 List of male mixed martial artists

References

External links

 Official website
 
 

1980 births
American male mixed martial artists
Middleweight mixed martial artists
Mixed martial artists utilizing taekwondo
Mixed martial artists utilizing wrestling
Mixed martial artists utilizing Brazilian jiu-jitsu
Mixed martial artists from North Carolina
American male taekwondo practitioners
Living people
American practitioners of Brazilian jiu-jitsu
People awarded a black belt in Brazilian jiu-jitsu
Sportspeople from Fayetteville, North Carolina
Sportspeople from Mission Viejo, California
People from Fort Bragg, North Carolina
Ultimate Fighting Championship male fighters